Villa Berthet is a town in Chaco Province, Argentina. It is the head town of the San Lorenzo Department.

External links

Populated places in Chaco Province
Populated places established in 1929